Laurent Castellana (born 17 January 1987) is a Belgian footballer who plays as a defender for Olympic Charleroi.

Career
Castellana began his career in the youth departments of Standard Liège. In 2005, he signed a professional contract with Dutch second-tier club MVV Maastricht. He made his professional league debut on 23 September 2005, in a 2–0 home win against VVV-Venlo, coming on as an 87-minute substitute for Tom van Bergen.

After spending a seven years of his career with MVV Maastricht, in January 2013 Castellana joined Etar 1924 in Bulgaria. He netted a goal, opening the scoring in the 1:6 loss against Litex in an April 2013 A PFG match. Castellana left the team at the end of the season.

Ahead of the 2019–20 season, Castellana joined Olympic Charleroi.

References

External links
Laurent Castellana player profile at vi.nl

1987 births
Living people
Belgian footballers
Belgian expatriate footballers
Association football defenders
Footballers from Liège
MVV Maastricht players
FC Etar 1924 Veliko Tarnovo players
Eerste Divisie players
First Professional Football League (Bulgaria) players
Expatriate footballers in Bulgaria
Belgian expatriate sportspeople in Bulgaria